Therapist is a person who offers any kinds of therapy. Therapists are trained professionals in the field of any types of services like psychologists, social workers, counsellors, life coachers and others. They are helpful in counselling individuals for various mental and physical issues.

Meaning 
Therapist refers to trained professionals engaged in providing services any kind of treatment or rehabilitation.

Reasons 
Therapist helps in resolving below issues:

 Issues on anxiety
 Issues on behaviour
 Issues on depression
 Issues on managing life changes
 Issues on eating disorder
 Issues on loneliness
 Issues on having complexion
 Grieving issues
 Issues on self esteem
 Issues due to negative thinking
 Issues due to chronic illness
 Issues on getting sleep
 Gender based or sexuality issues
 Issues on Relationship
 Society based issues
 Stress based issues
 Alcohol addiction based issues
 Issues due to suicide or self harm based thoughts
 Trauma related issues

Types 
Following are various types of therapists.

 Therapists for addiction
 Therapists for art
 Therapists for children
 Therapists for massage
 Therapists for marriage and children
 Therapists for music
 Therapists for occupation
 Therapists for physical body
 Therapists for psychology
 Therapists for yoga
 Psychotherapists belong to varied fields like psychologists, social workers, psychiatric nurses, and psychiatrists

Specialisation 
Therapist are basically specialised in below areas:

 Disorders in behaviour
 Mental health of Community
 Schooling and career
 Related to rehabilitation
 Substance based abuse
 autism and/or autism awareness

Education 
A therapist or a licensed counselor is required to qualify in state licensure exam and also preferred to have a master's degree in addition to completion of internship with a practicing supervisor.

Some  bachelor's degree holding counselors also practice under the guidance of licensed therapist or a psychologist. Few counselors prefer to have art therapy or addictions prevention training.

Benefits 
Following are the benefits of consulting a therapist.

 Improvement of physical and mental health
 Creating awareness on thoughts and its effect on behaviours
 Practically understanding the relationship between thoughts and actions
 Friendly support and understanding
 Indepth knowledge in experience and behaviours
 Self awareness
 Improving social relationships
 Learning new skills in managing stress
 Interaction of issues like fear and worries with a neutral person

References 

Therapy